Bower Slack Broaddus (May 30, 1888 – December 10, 1949) was a United States district judge of the United States District Court for the Eastern District of Oklahoma, the United States District Court for the Northern District of Oklahoma and the United States District Court for the Western District of Oklahoma.

Education and career

Born in Chillicothe, Missouri, Broaddus received a Bachelor of Laws from the Kansas City School of Law (now the University of Missouri–Kansas City School of Law) in 1910. He was in private practice in Muskogee, Oklahoma from 1910 to 1940. He was a police judge in Muskogee from 1912 to 1914, and was a city attorney of Muskogee from 1926 to 1930. He was a member of the Oklahoma House of Representatives from 1933 to 1935, and of the Oklahoma Senate from 1935 to 1938.

Federal judicial service

Broaddus was nominated by President Franklin D. Roosevelt on September 24, 1940, to a joint seat on the United States District Court for the Eastern District of Oklahoma, the United States District Court for the Northern District of Oklahoma and the United States District Court for the Western District of Oklahoma vacated by Judge Alfred P. Murrah. He was confirmed by the United States Senate on September 27, 1940, and received his commission on October 1, 1940. His service terminated on December 10, 1949, due to his death.

References

Sources
 

1888 births
1949 deaths
People from Chillicothe, Missouri
Oklahoma state court judges
20th-century Members of the Oklahoma House of Representatives
Democratic Party members of the Oklahoma House of Representatives
Democratic Party Oklahoma state senators
Judges of the United States District Court for the Western District of Oklahoma
Judges of the United States District Court for the Northern District of Oklahoma
Judges of the United States District Court for the Eastern District of Oklahoma
United States district court judges appointed by Franklin D. Roosevelt
20th-century American judges
People from Muskogee, Oklahoma